Krestyanka is a rural locality (a selo) and the administrative center of Krestyansky Selsoviet, Mamontovsky District, Altai Krai, Russia. The population was 1,219 as of 2013. There are 16 streets.

Geography 
Krestyanka is located 50 km south of Mamontovo (the district's administrative centre) by road. Korobeynikovo is the nearest rural locality.

References 

Rural localities in Mamontovsky District